Riverchild is the first extended play (EP) by Filipina singer Clara Benin. Its title comes from the fourth song of the EP, "Riverchild". The EP consists of five tracks, four original songs and 1 cover.

Background
A few months after Human Eyes was released, Benin already started working on producing more music.

The "Riverchild" EP project serves as an advocacy campaign for bringing children to school. Proceeds will go to the Tapulanga Foundation, a non-profit charitable organization working to uplift the lives of those who were born with less through educational scholarships and healthcare assistance.

Track listing
4 songs were written by Benin.

References

External links

2015 EPs
Clara Benin albums